Henning Bahs (12 March 1928 – 29 March 2002) was a Danish screenwriter and special effects designer. He wrote for more than 40 films between 1960 and 2002. He is best known as the co-author (with Erik Balling) of the Olsen-banden series of films. The Henning Bahs Award was established in 2012 by the Danish Film Critics Association in commemoration of Bahs' death ten years earlier.

Selected filmography 
 Forelsket i København (1960)
 A Farmer's Life (1965)
 Relax Freddie (1966)
 The Olsen Gang (1968)
 The Olsen Gang Sees Red (1976)
 Jeppe på bjerget (1981)
 Varning för Jönssonligan (1981)
 Jönssonligan och Dynamit-Harry (1982)
 Jönssonligan får guldfeber (1984)

References

External links 
 
 

1928 births
2002 deaths
Danish male screenwriters
Special effects people
20th-century screenwriters
Bodil Honorary Award recipients